was a village located in Agawa District, Kōchi Prefecture, Japan.

As of 2003, the village had an estimated population of 3,163 and a density of 19.59 persons per km2. The total area was 161.43 km2.

On October 1, 2004, Gohoku, along with the village of Hongawa (from Tosa District), was merged into the expanded town of Ino, and no longer exists as an independent municipality.

External links
 Official website of Ino in Japanese

Dissolved municipalities of Kōchi Prefecture
Ino, Kōchi